Levan Arabuli (born 29 March 1992) is a Georgian Greco-Roman wrestler. In 2020, he won the silver medal in the 130 kg event at the 2020 European Wrestling Championships held in Rome, Italy. In the final, he lost against Alin Alexuc-Ciurariu of Romania.

In 2017, he won one of the bronze medals in the 130 kg event at the 2017 European Wrestling Championships held in Novi Sad, Serbia.

Achievements

References

External links 
 

Living people
1992 births
Place of birth missing (living people)
Male sport wrestlers from Georgia (country)
European Wrestling Championships medalists
21st-century people from Georgia (country)